Sergei Likhachev (20 March 1940 — 18 October 2016) was a Soviet tennis player and tennis coach. He competed in the Davis Cup from 1962 to 1973.

References

External links 
 
 
 
 

1940 births
2016 deaths
Azerbaijani male tennis players
Soviet male tennis players
Universiade medalists in tennis
Universiade silver medalists for the Soviet Union